Sri Kodandaramaswamy Temple is one of the famous temples, after Tirumala Venkateswara Temple, in the holy city of Tirupati located in Tirupati district of Andhra Pradesh, India. The temple is dedicated to Lord Rama an incarnation of Vishnu along with Sita and Lakshmana. The temple also has a sub-shrine for Anjaneya the mount of Lord Sri Rama.

History

Legend
According to Varaha Purana, during Treta Yuga, Lord Sri Rama resided here along with Sita Devi and Lakshmana on his return from Lankapuri.

Medieval History
It was built by a Cholas during the tenth century AD.

Administration
The present day temple is organised by Tirumala Tirupati Devasthanams board.

Festivals
Rama Navami is celebrated with major grandeur at this temple which includes Hanumantha Vahana Seva in connection with Sri Rama Navami day, followed by Sri Sita Rama Kalyanam on Dasami and Sri Rama Pattabhisheka Mahotsavam on Ekadasi. The nine-day annual brahmotsavams celebrated every year which falls between March and April is another biggest event in the temple.
The Annual three-day Teppotsavams(Float festival) will be celebrated during April at the temple where the processional deity of Sri Rama along with Sita and Lakshmana will taken over a float in Sri Ramachandra Pushkarini.

See also
 Hindu Temples in Tirupati
 List of temples under Tirumala Tirupati Devasthanams

Reference lists 

 TTD Seva Online

Tirupati
Hindu temples in Tirupati district
Tirumala Tirupati Devasthanams